Timothy Alexander "Tim" Munnings (born 22 June 1966 in Nassau) is a Bahamian athlete who mainly competes in the 400 metres.

At the 2000 Summer Olympics he ran in the heats for the Bahamian team who eventually won the bronze medal.

His personal best time is 45.81 seconds, achieved in June 2001 in Nassau.  Set the day after his 35th birthday, at the time, it stood as the Masters M35 World record for over three years.  Later that year, he anchored the World Champion relay team in National Record time, sprinting past Jamaica with a speedy final 100m.  While Bahamas lost to the United States in both the 2000 Olympics and 2001 World Championships, the USA was disqualified years later due to the PED doping violation by Antonio Pettigrew.  After numerous appeals, the Bahamian team medals were upgraded.  During the 2013 medal ceremony, Munnings was credited by teammate Carl Oliver with starting the Olympic renaissance that developed into Bahamian medal success through the decade.

Achievements

References

Living people
1966 births
Bahamian male sprinters
Sportspeople from Nassau, Bahamas
Olympic athletes of the Bahamas
Athletes (track and field) at the 1996 Summer Olympics
Athletes (track and field) at the 2000 Summer Olympics
Medalists at the 1996 Summer Olympics
Medalists at the 2000 Summer Olympics
Commonwealth Games medallists in athletics
Athletes (track and field) at the 1998 Commonwealth Games
Athletes (track and field) at the 2002 Commonwealth Games
Athletes (track and field) at the 2006 Commonwealth Games
Athletes (track and field) at the 2003 Pan American Games
World Athletics Championships medalists
Olympic bronze medalists for the Bahamas
Olympic bronze medalists in athletics (track and field)
Commonwealth Games bronze medallists for the Bahamas
Pan American Games competitors for the Bahamas
Goodwill Games medalists in athletics
World Athletics Championships winners
Competitors at the 2001 Goodwill Games
Medallists at the 2002 Commonwealth Games